Fishing River Township is an inactive township in Ray County, in the U.S. state of Missouri. It is part of the Kansas City metropolitan area.

History
Fishing River Township was founded in 1821, taking its name from the Fishing River.

References

Townships in Ray County, Missouri
Townships in Missouri